Frank Schade (born January 22, 1950) is an American former professional basketball player and coach.

As a high school junior, Schade played on the Wausau High School Lumberjacks team which finished as runners-up in the 1967 WIAA Boys Basketball Championship.

While recruited to play for coach Don Haskins at Texas Western (now the University of Texas at El Paso), he elected to stay in Wisconsin to attend the University of Wisconsin–Eau Claire where he scored 1599 points from 1969–72. In his final year at Eau Claire, the Blugolds finished as NAIA national runners-up to Kentucky State University.

Schade was selected in the 1972 NBA draft by the Kansas City–Omaha Kings, and played nine games with the team in the 1972–73 NBA season.

In 2012, Schade earned his 500th victory as a coach at Oshkosh North High School.  He is the winningest coach in Wisconsin boys basketball history to not have won a state championship.

In 2017, Schade earned his 600th victory as a coach. After the 2017 season, Schade announced he would retire as the boys basketball coach at Oshkosh North after 31 years. Schade compiled five state tournament appearances and five conference titles at Oshkosh North while playing in the Fox Valley Association, one of the best leagues in the state of Wisconsin. Before coaching at Oshkosh North he was the head basketball coach at Plymouth High School where he coached for 11 seasons. Schade finished with a career record of 609-316 (437-234 at North)(172-82 at Plymouth) ranking fourth in total wins in the state of Wisconsin when he retired. A year after Schade retired, Oshkosh North won its first state boys basketball championship in school history.

References

1950 births
Living people
American men's basketball players
Basketball coaches from Wisconsin
Basketball players from Wisconsin
Guards (basketball)
High school basketball coaches in the United States
Kansas City Kings draft picks
Kansas City Kings players
Sportspeople from Wausau, Wisconsin
University of Texas at El Paso alumni
Wisconsin–Eau Claire Blugolds men's basketball players